The Serie B 1940–41 was the twelfth tournament of this competition played in Italy since its creation.

Teams
Reggiana, Savona, Vicenza and Macerata had been promoted from Serie C, while Liguria and Modena had been relegated from Serie A. Additionally, Spezia was admitted from Serie C to fill a vacancy.

Final classification

Results

References and sources
Almanacco Illustrato del Calcio - La Storia 1898-2004, Panini Edizioni, Modena, September 2005

Serie B seasons
2
Italy